"Manhaul" is a 1962 Australian television film. It aired 8 September 1962 as part of The General Motors Hour, an occasional series which presented various one-off productions. It aired on ATN-7 in Sydney, QTQ-9 in Brisbane and GTV-9 in Melbourne , despite the two stations having severed their relationship with the formation of the Nine Network.

Filmink magazine later wrote "Tell us this doesn’t sound like it would be awesome?... Australia’s own version of The Thing… Well, with no creature but still… a murder mystery at a base in Antarctica… How cool is that?"

Plot
At an Australian outpost in Douglas Bay in the Australian Antarctic Territory, there are seven men, who have served there for 12 months. They are meant to be relieved but then their departure is delayed.

Frieberg is a Jewish man which a power over Norwegian, Sven Nordstrom, which results in Nordstrom doing Frieberg's work. Other men include the Australian Dinny, the camp doctor Dr. Lewis Hilton, a meteorologist  called Sietel  and the expedition leader, Charles Forrester.

Frieberg is found dead in the snow with a bullet in his back The expedition cannot be relieved for another six months. Forrester took the only rifle   and seal gun, locked himself in a separate hut, and let everyone think he did it. The expedition members decide to manhaul over the ice rather than stay in cap, but Forrester stopped that by driving the only  tractor into   the bay.

Eventually Sven reveals Frieberg's power over him became about because Sven's father commanded a concentration camp, leading to blackmail and murder.

Cast
Wynn Roberts as Charles Forrester
Fred Parslow as Dr Lewis
George Fairfax as Sietel
Gordon Glenwright as an Australian, Dinny McQuade
Kurt Ludescher as Sven Nordstrom.
Dennis Miller as Hilton
Bruce Barry as Frieberg

Production
The play was written by former Australian war correspondent Osmar White, who had accompanied the 1955-58 expedition to the South Pole.

The cast was all-male and consisted of six Melbourne actors and one Sydney actor (Gordon Glenwright). Most of the play takes place in three snow huts built in the Melbourne studio from the authentic patterns of those constructed in the Antarctic.

It included footage shot in the Antarctic.

It was produced and directed jointly by the team of Rod Kinnear and John Sumner who had previously collaborated on the adaptation of The One Day of the Year.

It was shot at GTV-9 studios in Melbourne. Shooting took two Saturdays.

Running time
There is conflicting information on the running time. The Age listed it as airing in a 75-minute time-slot, while the Sydney Morning Herald listed it airing in a 60-minute time-slot. The running time excluding commercials is not known (for example, hour-long Homicide episodes from the mid-1960s often run 45–47 minutes, while Bandstand episodes could run as long as 51 minutes. 1960 television film Reflections in Dark Glasses, which aired in a one-hour time-slot runs 48 minutes).

Reception
The TV critic for the Sydney Morning Herald said "a well-built set and two or three good performances... did much to enliven" the production and that it was "a good idea" but "unfortunately, Mr White seems to have been in some doubt whether to make his play a simple whodunit or a study of the kind of men who for reasons not purely scientific, might seek refuge from life in a world of isolation. The compromise required in attempting both was damaging to the play... If local TV drama is to be taken seriously, it will need better productions than this one... and better plays" "

The play was criticised by the Anglican church for the language used by the characters.

The Bulletin called it "impossible....  though well produced, mounted   and   photographed   on  tape,   the   whole   affair   was preposterous  and   only   productions   which   set   out   to   be just   that,   to   provoke   laughter,   can   stay   the   viewers’   itchy   tuning   finger   whe  unlikely   things   begin   to   happen   on   the   screen. Perhaps   the   oddest aspect   of   all   was   the   credit   given   to   the   Commonwealth Antarctic Division   for   its   co-operation, exact   nature   unstated,   in   the   production.   “Manhaul”   was   neatly   calculated   to   give us   the impression   that   some   part   of   our   taxes   are   used   to   maintain   groups   of   men   in   bickering   idleness   down   in   the  Antarctic.

See also
Shell Presents

References

External links
 
 

1962 television plays
1960s Australian television plays
1962 Australian television episodes
Black-and-white television episodes
The General Motors Hour